Bishan-Ang Mo Kio Park or Bishan-AMK Park, (formerly known as Bishan Park) is a major park in Singapore, located in the popular heartland of Bishan. Serving the residents of Bishan, Yishun and Ang Mo Kio, the park sits entirely within Bishan, running along the Ang Mo Kio–Bishan boundary line, which is situated at Ang Mo Kio Avenue 1. In the middle of the park lies the Kallang River, which runs through it in the form of a flat riverbed.

History
Bishan Park was constructed to provide a buffer between Ang Mo Kio New Town and Bishan New Town. It was also envisioned as a leisure destination for residents ranging from children to nature-lovers, containing facilities such as a football field, a floating amphitheatre and a natural pond. Construction took place in two stages. The park, which cost $8.5 million to build, was one of the biggest park projects by the Housing Development Board at the time of its construction. Before construction work was completed, people from the adjacent areas began using the unfinished facilities, making work on the park difficult.

Redevelopment

Background
The Active, Beautiful, Clean Waters (ABC Waters) Programme was launched in 2006 to transform the country’s water bodies beyond their functions of drainage and water supply into beautiful and clean rivers and lakes with new spaces for community bonding and recreation. At the same time, it promotes the application of a new, water-sensitive urban design approach (also known as ABC Waters design features in Singapore) to managing rainwater sustainably. A long-term initiative, over 100 locations have been identified for project implementation in phases by 2030, with 20 projects already completed, bringing people closer to water. 
ABC Waters Kallang River @ Bishan-Ang Mo Kio Park is one of the flagship projects under this programme. The park was due for major refurbishment and the Kallang River in the form of a concrete channel along the park edges was also due for upgrading to cater to increased rainwater runoff from the catchment due to urbanisation. Plans were thus made to carry out redevelopment works together, transforming Kallang River from a linear utilitarian concrete drainage channel into a meandering, natural river through the park.

Design process 
The integration of the river and park involved joint responsibilities between government agencies in charge of different areas (parks and water). The National Water Agency, PUB, and NParks engaged Ramboll Studio Dreiseitl (design) and CH2M Hill (engineering) to look at how the park, river and surrounding residential estates could be integrated as one. This took place through a series of workshops, on-site tours and discussions where issues were thrown out and ideas were exchanged and debated. The suitability of plant species for soil bioengineering, for example, had not been implemented in Singapore prior to this, and thus had to be tested – this was done through a year-long survey at the test reach (see Techniques). Other parties which came on board included bioengineering specialists and horticulturists

Project Details and Cost 
Landscape Architecture: Atelier Dreiseitl 

Partners in Charge: Herbert Dreiseitl, Gerhard Hauber 

Project Management and Lead Design: Tobias Baur, Rudolf Mager, Leonard Ng, Hendrik Porst 

Project Engineers: Andreas Bockmühl, Stefan Brückmann 

Project Team: Jeff Boggess, Angelika Büchele, Jason Chia, Edith, Gustavo Glaeser, Tobias Klinger, Martin Koller, Birgit Kühlbrandt, Wi Ming, Herbert Montevirgen, Vera Sieber, Angela Soler, Chanida Suebpanich, Sebastian Walker, Melissa Yip, Ingo Zoefelt, Christoph Hald, Nengshi Zheng 

Bioengineering: Peter Geitz und Partner JV 

Partner: CH2MHILL 

Project owners: PUB, Singapore’s national water agency and the National Parks Board 

Area: Central catchment 140 km² 62 ha / 155 acres 

Client: Public Utilities Board & National Parks Board 

Design: 2007 – 2010 

Construction: 2009-2012 

Cost: 76 million SGD / 45 million € / US$ 60 million 

Awards: WAF 2012, Excellence on the Waterfront Honor Award 2012, President’s Design Award Singapore 2012

Opening

Amidst a crowd of 2000 people including residents, local community partners such as schools and non-profit groups, Prime Minister Lee Hsien Loong officially opened the redeveloped park on 17 March 2012, renaming it Bishan-Ang Mo Kio Park.

Gallery

See also
 Kallang River
Herbert Dreiseitl
List of parks in Singapore
National Parks Board

References

External links

Atelier Dreiseitl
CH2M Hill
Bishan-AMK Park - National Parks Board
Bishan Park - Public Utilities Board
Bishan Park Opening AsiaOne News Article
World Landscape Architect
TreeHugger
Landscape Architecture Magazine
ECOWAN

 

Ang Mo Kio
Bishan, Singapore
Kallang
Parks in Singapore
Rivers of Singapore
Tourist attractions in North-East Region, Singapore
Tourist attractions in Central Region, Singapore